Edmund Augustus Blundell (8 August 1804 – 12 October 1868) was a British Colonial administrator.

History
Born 8 August 1804 in Taunton, Somerset, England, the son of William Blundell & Mary Ann Horniblow. He joined East India Company as a writer in 1820 and was a British diplomat and Commissioner of Tenasserim 1833–1843, Resident Councillor of Malacca from 1847 to 1849 and Resident Councillor of Penang from 1849 to 1855. He became Governor of Straits Settlements (1855 - 1859), which was administered by British India.

He was married to Mellor Mynors Farmer. In addition, he had a Burmese mistress who gave him 11 children. He gave them his name and sent them to be educated in Calcutta and England. Blundell died in 1868 at Harrogate.

While the above information regarding the marriage and Burmese mistress is recorded in the Historical dictionary of Singapore it is important to note that Edmund Augustus Blundell married Mellor Mynors Farmer on 22 January 1861 after he had returned to England. By this time his children were all of adult age and at least some were married. All of his children were born to his Burmese partner who was known as Louisa.

References

1804 births
1868 deaths
British diplomats
Administrators in British Malaya
Governors of the Straits Settlements
Administrators in British Singapore
People from Taunton